Allan J Robinson (born 1935–2010), was a male weightlifter who competed for England.

Weightlifting career
He represented Great Britain at the 1960 Summer Olympics finishing in 18th place in the featherweight category.

He represented England and finished fifth in the -60 kg combined category at the 1958 British Empire and Commonwealth Games in Cardiff, Wales.

He was a body builder and won the 1955 Mr. Great Britain competition, he ran a gym in the Lancashire town of Blackburn with Darwen and was a plumber by trade.

References

1935 births
2010 deaths
English male weightlifters
Weightlifters at the 1958 British Empire and Commonwealth Games
Olympic weightlifters of Great Britain
Weightlifters at the 1960 Summer Olympics
Commonwealth Games competitors for England